Karen Henthorn (born 1963) is a British character actress who portrayed the role of Teresa Bryant in the long-running British soap opera Coronation Street. She appeared in the role briefly in 2007 and became a regular character in 2008. Her character was involved in major story lines. In late 2008, she left the show but returned on 13 April 2009. She then departed the show in 2010.

Henthorn was born in Oldham, Lancashire. Her roles before Coronation Street included parts in series such as The Booze Cruise, in which she played Cath Bolton, Doctors and Heartbeat. She also played Julie Haye in EastEnders in 1997–1998 and Marissa Platting (Series 2 Social Worker) in the television series Shameless.

She currently teaches screen acting on the BA (Hons) Acting course at Italia Conti Academy in Clapham and Manchester School of Theatre.

She has most recently appeared on Sky One's comedy series Trollied. She also played a school's inspector in the 2010s CBBC series Young Dracula, and plays Janet Macy on the BBC Three series In the Flesh.

In 2013 she appeared in the touring National Theatre production of War Horse.

In 2022 she starred in the channel 5 programme The Teacher alongside Sheridan Smith and Kelvin Fletcher

In 2023 she appeared in Series 12 episode 4 of ITV's Vera as Jill Falstone.

References

External links
 

English soap opera actresses
English television actresses
1963 births
Living people
Actresses from Oldham
Actresses from Lancashire